Fairymead may refer to:

 Fairymead, Queensland, a locality in the Bundaberg Region, Queensland, Australia
 Fairymead House, a heritage-listed house in Bundaberg North, Queensland, Australia